Ram Air Freight was a cargo airline based in Morrisville, North Carolina, United States. It specialized in prompt freight transportation. The airline had its main base at the Raleigh-Durham International Airport.  It ceased operations on March 2, 2012.

History

Ram Air Freight was established in 1982 with a fleet of Grumman Cheetah.
It ceased operations on March 2, 2012.

Destinations
The airline flies to 37 destinations across the Mid-Atlantic and South United States. 
Alabama
Birmingham (Birmingham-Shuttlesworth International Airport)
Mobile (Mobile Downtown Airport)

Florida
Fort Lauderdale (Fort Lauderdale Executive Airport)
Fort Myers (Fort Myers-Page Field Airport)
Jacksonville (Jacksonville-Craig Airport)
Orlando (Orlando-Executive Airport)
Sarasota (Sarasota International Airport)
Jacksonville (Tampa International Airport)

Georgia
Atlanta (DeKalb-Peachtree Airport)
Atlanta (Fulton County Airport)
Gainesville (Lee Gilmer Memorial Airport)
Macon (Middle Georgia Regional Airport)
Savannah (Savannah/Hilton Head International Airport)

Kentucky
Lexington (Blue Grass Airport)
Louisville (Bowman Field)

Maryland
Baltimore (Martin State Airport)

North Carolina
Asheville (Asheville Regional Airport)
Charlotte (Charlotte/Douglas International Airport)
Concord (Concord Regional Airport) 
Elizabeth City (Elizabeth City Regional Airport)
Fayetteville (Fayetteville Regional Airport)
Greenville (Pitt-Greenville Airport)
Hatteras (Billy Mitchell Airport)
Jacksonville (Albert J. Ellis Airport)
Kinston (Kinston Regional Jetport)
Lumberton (Lumberton Municipal Airport)
Manteo (Dare County Regional Airport)
New Bern (Coastal Carolina Regional Airport)
Raleigh (Raleigh-Durham International Airport) Main Base
Rocky Mount (Rocky Mount-Wilson Regional Airport)
Southern Pines (Moore County Airport)
Wilmington (Wilmington International Airport)

South Carolina
Beaufort (Beaufort County Airport)
Columbia (Columbia Metropolitan Airport)
Hilton Head (Hilton Head Airport)
Myrtle Beach (Myrtle Beach International Airport)

Virginia
Abingdon (Virginia Highlands Airport)
Newport News (Newport News/Williamsburg International Airport)
Norfolk (Norfolk International Airport)
Richmond (Hanover County Municipal Airport)
Richmond (Richmond International Airport)
Roanoke (Roanoke Regional Airport)

West Virginia
Charleston (Yeager Airport)

Fleet

Ram Air Freight operated about 30 aircraft of four types:

Piper PA-34 Seneca
Piper PA-32R
Cessna 402
Beechcraft Baron

See also 
 List of defunct airlines of the United States

References 

Defunct airlines of the United States
Airlines established in 1982
Airlines disestablished in 2012
Defunct cargo airlines
Companies based in Raleigh, North Carolina
1982 establishments in North Carolina
2012 disestablishments in North Carolina